Dreamers or The Dreamers may refer to:

Books
 "Dreamers", a 1918 war poem by Siegfried Sassoon
 "The Dreamers" (play), a 1982 play by Jack Davis
 The Dreamers (novel series), a 2003–06  fantasy series by David Eddings and Leigh Eddings
 The Dreamers (novel), a 2019 science-fiction novel by Karen Thompson Walker
 Dreamers (novel), a 1904 novel by Knut Hamsun

Film and TV
 Dreamers (film), a 2010 film
 Unsettled Land, also called The Dreamers, 1987 Hebrew film by Uri Barbash
 The Dreamers (2003 film), a film by director Bernardo Bertolucci
 The Dreamers (unfinished film), an unfinished film from Orson Welles

Music
 The Dreamers (opera), a 1996 chamber opera by David Conte
 Freddie and the Dreamers, 1960s British beat music band
 The Dreamers of Phi Mu Alpha, an all-male a cappella group at Penn State
 Dreamers, the first name used by the alternative rock band Concrete Blonde, apparently for a single recording ("Heart Attack")
 Dreamers (band), an American pop-rock duo

Albums
 Dreamers (album), an album by Shine Bright Baby
 Dreamers (album by Janyse Jaud)
 The Dreamers (album), a 2008 album from the music romance series by John Zorn

Songs
 "The Dreamers" (David Bowie song), a song written by David Bowie and Reeves Gabrels
 "Dreamers", 1981 single by David Soul written by J. Murphy, D. McKenzie
 "Dreamers", 1981 song by Firefall, written by David Muse, George Hawkins
 "Dreamers", song from the musical Jean Seberg by Marvin Hamlisch and Christopher Adler; 1984 single by Frankie Vaughan
 "Dreamers" (Rizzle Kicks song), 2012  
 "Dreamers", a song by Jack Savoretti
 "Dreamers" (Jungkook song), a song by BTS member Jungkook

Other uses
 The Dreamers (sculpture), an art work by Larry Zink and Monica Taylor
 Recipients of resident status under DREAM Act or DACA
 Oneirodidae, a family of deepsea anglerfish commonly called "dreamers"

See also 
 The Dreamer (disambiguation)